Disney Channel was a Turkish 24-hour free-to-air television network owned and operated by Disney Televizyon Yayıncılık A.Ş. (transl.: Disney Television Broadcasting Inc.); part of The Walt Disney Company Turkey. Broadcasting for children and youth-oriented shows in Turkish, targeted for ages 7 to 14 years old.

History
It launched on 29 April 2007 on Digiturk. All the programming were dubbed in Turkish, while the network was headquartered in Etiler, Istanbul. On 1 May 2011, Disney Channel updated the logo by putting the Mickey Mouse silhouette in a smartphone application icon. The same thing happened in other countries from Europe and CEE.

On 21 December 2011, Disney started the test transmission for the Turkish Disney Channel and started broadcasting mainly promotional ads; no advertising or programs included. It later it became a free-to-air channel on 12 January 2012, with an episode of Phineas & Ferb as its first program.

On 28 October 2013, Disney Channel launched its VOD service in Turkey.

The network was closed on 31 March 2022, and removal from the channel list on 2 April 2022, and its programming became part of Disney+ when it launched on 14 June 2022.

Sister channels

Disney Junior 

Disney Junior is a pre-school channel, under The Walt Disney Company Limited. It began as Disney Channel's morning block, known as Playhouse Disney on 29 April 2007. It launched as television channel on 1 September 2010, and rebranded as Disney Junior on 1 June 2011.

As of March 31, 2022, Disney Junior is currently the only Disney-branded channel in Turkey.

Disney XD (closed) 

Disney XD launched on 3 October 2009, becoming a 24-hour channel on 3 October 2018, and was exclusive to Digiturk.

On 31 January 2021, Disney XD was closed; but however, Disney Channel continued to operate until 31 March 2022, with programming moving to Disney+ when it launched on 14 June 2022.

References

External links
 Disney Channel Türkiye

Turkey
Defunct television channels in Turkey
Television channels and stations established in 2007
Television channels and stations disestablished in 2022
Children's television networks
2007 establishments in Turkey
2022 disestablishments in Turkey